Elizabeth Valerie Davies (29 June 1912 – 2 August 2001), later known by her married name Valerie Latham, was a Welsh competitive swimmer who represented Great Britain at the 1932 Summer Olympics. She was born in Cardiff and died in Newport.

In the 1932 Olympics she won bronze medals in the 100 m backstroke event and in 4×100 m freestyle relay event and was third in her first round heat of 100 m freestyle event and did not advance. She also competed for Wales at the 1930 British Empire Games winning all three medals. She was awarded two silver medals in the 100 yards backstroke and the 400 yards freestyle and a bronze medal in the 100 yards freestyle. Four years later she won the bronze medal in the 100 yards backstroke event.

See also
 List of Olympic medalists in swimming (women)

References

External links

1912 births
2001 deaths
Commonwealth Games bronze medallists for Wales
Commonwealth Games silver medallists for Wales
European Aquatics Championships medalists in swimming
Female backstroke swimmers
British female freestyle swimmers
Olympic bronze medallists for Great Britain
Olympic bronze medalists in swimming
Olympic swimmers of Great Britain
Sportspeople from Cardiff
Swimmers at the 1930 British Empire Games
Swimmers at the 1932 Summer Olympics
Swimmers at the 1934 British Empire Games
Welsh female swimmers
Medalists at the 1932 Summer Olympics
Commonwealth Games medallists in swimming
Welsh Olympic medallists
Medallists at the 1930 British Empire Games
Medallists at the 1934 British Empire Games